Ismail Arif Baytın (Also known as Miralay Arif Bey) was an Ottoman Army officer and a Turkish politician. He was the commander of 29th Infantry Division at the Battle of Sarikamish.

Biography
Baytin was a graduate of Ottoman Military College and served in the following positions: Greek Border Arbitration and Construction Command, 3rd Army Redif Squads Headquarters, Erkan-ı Harbiye District Governorate, Damascus War School Directorate and Ministry of Lessons, 3rd Army Military Officer's Office, 6th Army Corps Chief of Staff, Divan-ı Scholar Military Investigation Committee Member, 3rd Branch Directorate, 29th Division and Investigation and Classification Police Command, Muğla Transactions Assistant Director, Military Staff Historical War Department, Istanbul 6th Reconstruction and Settlement Zone Directorate and Inspectorate, Member of the Antalya Governorship, Ankara Aircraft Company Government Representative Office, Undersecretariat of the Ministry of Public Works, GNAT V. Term (By-term Election), VI. and VII. He also commanded the Ottoman Army during World War I in the Caucasus Front. He was married and had two children.

References

1874 births
1950 deaths
Ottoman Army generals
Ottoman military personnel of World War I
20th-century Turkish politicians
Members of the Grand National Assembly of Turkey